The 1900 international cricket season was from April 1900 to September 1900. The season includes 1900 Summer Olympics cricket match.

Season overview

August

Cricket at the 1900 Olympic Games

Boston Zingari in Newfoundland

References

International cricket competitions by season
1900 in cricket